Dim Lit is the debut album by British jazz band Polar Bear, formed and led by drummer Sebastian Rochford.

Background

Polar Bear were awarded Best Band at the BBC Jazz Awards 2004, giving Dim Lit a platform for small scale success. It was eventually surpassed by their following album Held On The Tips Of Fingers (2005), which was nominated for a Mercury Music Prize.

The album was initially released on Babel Label and re-issued by The Leaf Label in 2014.

Reception

The Guardian write that this album "captures (Polar Bear's) unique virtues" and that it "goes straight on to the albums-of-2004 longlist". The BBC call Dim Lit "a finely crafted album" in their review of the follow-up album.

Track listing 

All tracks written by Seb Rochford

Personnel

Polar Bear
 Pete Wareham — tenor saxophone
 Mark Lockheart — tenor saxophone
 Sebastian Rochford - drums, percussion, drum programming
 Tom Herbert - double bass

Additional musicians 
 Julia Biel - vocals (6)
 Ben Davis - cello (3, 10)
 John Greswell - viola (3, 6, 10)
 Adam Bishop - bass clarinet (6)
 Robert Harder - piano (7)

References 

2004 debut albums
Polar Bear (British band) albums
The Leaf Label albums